was a Japanese daimyō of the Azuchi–Momoyama period, who served Toyotomi Hideyoshi.

Biography
His father, was a retainer of Oda Nobunaga. Naonori was killed in action when Akechi Mitsuhide attacked and killed Nobunaga at Honnō-ji in 1582 (Incident at Honnōji). Naoyasu then served Toyotomi Hideyoshi. 

In 1590, He took part in capturing Iwatsuki Castle and Oshi Castle at Musashi Province in the Odawara campaign, and was given 20,000 koku. After that, based in Imajo, Echizen Province, he supported Kobayakawa Hideaki and Horio Yoshiharu.

In 1600 at the Battle of Sekigahara, he was under Ōtani Yoshitsugu, who led part of Ishida Mitsunari's force. However, taking advantage of Kobayakawa Hideaki's betrayal, he switched sides with Wakisaka Yasuharu, Kutsuki Mototsuna and Ogawa Suketada. Together, they defeated Yoshitsugu's force.  After the battle, Tokugawa Ieyasu did not give Naoyasu credit and seized his domain. Because of that, Naoyasu became a retainer of Maeda Toshinaga, and was given a stipend of 7,000 koku.

Death
In 1606, looking over flooded Daimon River, in Etchū Province, he fell off a horse and died by drowning. Naoyasu was succeeded by his son, . The family remained retainers of the Maeda until the Meiji Restoration.

References
 Japanese Wiki article on Naoyasu (retrieved 14 Sept.)

1606 deaths
Daimyo
Deaths by drowning
Deaths by horse-riding accident in Japan
Year of birth unknown
16th-century Japanese people
17th-century Japanese people